Hacked is a remix album by SMP, released on February 19, 2002 by Underground, Inc. and Invisible Records.

Reception

Stewart Mason of AllMusic favorably compared Hacked to Skinny Puppy and Front Line Assembly but criticized the album for the amount of filler. He concluded by saying "only the most die-hard SMP fan will make it through this collection in one sitting."

Track listing

Personnel
Adapted from the Hacked liner notes.

SMP
 Jason Bazinet – lead vocals

Production and design
 Steph Dumais – design
 Heather Ivy – cover art
 Robert Sydow – cover art
 Jeremy Moss – additional vocals (2, 5, 7, 11, 13)
 Robert Sydow – engineering
 Deirdre Wehrman – management

Release history

References

External links 
 Hacked at iTunes
 Hacked at Discogs (list of releases)

2002 remix albums
SMP (band) albums
Invisible Records remix albums
Underground, Inc. remix albums